Olive Webb (born 1946 or 1947) is a New Zealand clinical psychologist and former president of the New Zealand Psychological Society from 1993 until 1995. Webb's experiences of poor patient conditions and treatment while working at Sunnyside Hospital in the 1970s inspired her to become a disability advocate. She received the New Zealand Order of Merit in 2008, for services to people with intellectual disabilities. Webb is the longest-serving member of the Canterbury District Health Board, holding a position on the board from 2001 to 2013.

Biography

Webb was born in 1946 or 1947, in rural Waipa District south of Te Awamutu. Her mother would hold annual parties for the residents of the Tokanui Psychiatric Hospital, and during high school and her early years at university, Web worked as a nurse aide at the hospital. She attended Te Awamutu College and the University of Waikato, where she studied geography.

Webb became frustrated with well-intentioned volunteers at the hospital, deciding to gain qualifications to better help residents of the hospital. Webb shifted to the South Island, studying clinical psychology at the University of Canterbury. In 1968, Webb began working at Sunnyside Hospital, a Christchurch mental asylum, as an assistant clinical psychologist. She spent 27 years working at the facility, during which she developed major concerns for patients' wellbeing, noting that staff had not received adequate training, and that patients were mistreated and understimulated, often spending much of their time unoccupied in cramped rooms. While working for the hospital, Webb completed a PhD in 1984, and a Post Graduate Diploma of Health Services Management in 1992.

Webb was appointed the Manager of the Psychiatric Service for adults with intellectual disability at Sunnyside Hospital, the first non-medical professional to be appointed in this role. During this time, Webb reduced the number of in-patients at the hospital from 150 to 25, by developing community care plans for patients. Webb also advocated for better medical checks for people with intellectual disabilities, after contributing to research which showed that 73% of patients in the study required medical care. Webb's work was a major factor in the deinstitutionalisation of New Zealand's mental health services, which led to psychiatric hospitals closing and being replaced with community mental health services.

From 1993 until 1995, Webb was the president of the New Zealand Psychological Society. In the 1990s, Webb moved from West Melton (where she had lived for 25 years) to Hororata, where she became a community leader.

In January 2001, Webb was elected as one of the inaugural members of the Canterbury District Health Board, during which she worked on developing the Intellectual Disability (Compulsory Care and Rehabilitation) Act 2003. When Webb stood down in 2013, she became the longest-serving member of the board. In the same year, Webb ran an unsuccessful bid to become the mayor of Selwyn District, coming second to incumbent Kelvin Coe.

Since 2020, Webb has worked with Living Options, a charitable trust supporting people with disabilities in the Queenstown-Lakes District.

In 2022, Webb took part in the Abuse in Care – Royal Commission of Inquiry, during which she likened treatment disabled people experienced in psychiatric care to World War II concentration camps.

Webb has been a trustee, chair or board member for a number of community trusts, including New Zealand Riding for the Disabled, Special Olympics New Zealand, Central Plains Water Trust, Hororata Community Trust and Selwyn Central Community Care Trust.

Awards

In 2008, Webb received the New Zealand Order of Merit for services to people with intellectual disabilities, due to her work on deinstitutionalisation and the development of community mental health services. In 2018, Webb was given the Distinguished Service award by the Australasian Society for Intellectual Disability.

Personal life

Webb identifies as a lesbian. She entered a civil union with her long-time partner Carol Gurney in 2004. Webb was an organist for the St John's Church in Hororata until the organ was destroyed in the 2010 Canterbury earthquake. Since then, she has performed piano for the church, and sings in the Selwyn Community Choir.

Bibliography

References

20th-century New Zealand LGBT people
21st-century New Zealand LGBT people
Canterbury District Health Board members
Lesbian academics
Lesbian scientists
Living people
New Zealand lesbians
New Zealand psychologists
New Zealand women academics
New Zealand women psychologists
Officers of the New Zealand Order of Merit
People from North Canterbury
People from Waikato
Date of birth missing (living people)
Year of birth missing (living people)
New Zealand disability rights activists
University of Canterbury alumni
University of Otago alumni
University of Waikato alumni
21st-century New Zealand psychologists
LGBT psychologists